A Little Vicious is a 1991 American short documentary film directed by Immy Humes about a dog in Connecticut about to be killed for biting people, until animal trainer Vicki Hearne steps in to help. It was nominated for an Academy Award for Best Documentary Short.

References

External links
A Little Vicious at The Doc Tank

1991 films
1991 documentary films
1991 short films
American independent films
1990s short documentary films
American short documentary films
Documentary films about dogs
Films shot in Connecticut
Films about pets
1991 independent films
1990s English-language films
1990s American films